Beydere is a village in the Fındıklı District, Rize Province, in Black Sea Region of Turkey. Its population is 363 (2021).

History 
According to list of villages in Laz language book (2009), name of the village is Tsupe. Most villagers are ethnically Hemshin.

Geography

References

Villages in Fındıklı District